The Advocate ("Barbados Advocate") is the second most dominant daily newspaper in the country of Barbados.  First established in 1895, the Advocate is the longest continually published newspaper in the country.  Printed in colour, the Advocate covers a wide array of topics including:  business, sports, entertainment news, politics, editorials, and special features.  In addition the Barbados Advocate also covers investigative journalism, plus local, regional and international news daily.

The headquarters for the Barbados Advocate are located to the west of the capital-city Bridgetown, in the Fontabelle, Saint Michael area.

The Barbados Advocate came under the ownership of Anthony T. Bryan in the year 2000. This is a significant milestone and achievement as Anthony Bryan is the first black publisher to own the Barbados Advocate since the newspaper began printing in 1895.

Two British companies acquired a majority interest in 1961. In 1960 the Daily Star became the second daily newspaper on the island, joining the Advocate. Joied the IAPA in 1954. As of 1946 it had never changed ownership since its inception in 1895, and had a circulation frozen at 7,000 (12,000 Sundays).

In 2020 the owner of The Advocate Sir Anthony Bryan KA, CHB, GCM, JP died,  leading to a lengthy legal battle.

See also 

 Media in Barbados
 Barbadian companies

References

External links 

 The Barbados Advocate (in Barbados)

Advocate Newspaper, The
Advocate, The